S.N.U.F.F. is a science fiction novel by Russian writer Victor Pelevin published in 2011.

Plot 

The plot's setting is a post-apocalyptic world where the majority of people live either in a poor, technologically backwards Urkaina  (not to be confused with the present Ukraine, though the pun is likely intended) with about 300 million Russian speaking inhabitants with a capital city "Slava" or in a technologically advanced artificial flying city "Big Byz" (or "Byzantium") which is locked in the sky above Urkaina and has a population of about 30 million, where English is used only as a Church language, Russian is used for regular communication.

The book invents a set of neologisms (mainly using English even in the Russian original) such as discourse monger - a provoker paid by Big Byz media and military who under disguise of defending human rights against Urkainian dictatorship (which is in fact covertly controlled by Big Byz), provokes a conflict, which usually leads to regularly repeated "wars" - organized slaughter and bombing campaigns by Big Byz's fused military and media against virtually weaponless Urkaine's people. Such "wars", thoroughly filmed and used for entertainment, are organized nearly every year, the perpetrators from the Big Byz side being porn stars wearing suits of Batman or Ninja Turtles rather than soldiers, and protected by flying drones from any damage. The resulting footage is called "S.N.U.F.F.", an acronym from "Special Newsreel/Universal Feature Film", and sold both in Big Byz and in Urkaina.

The story is narrated from the person of one Damilola Karpov, a pilot of a remotely controlled drone which is equipped with both a camera and multiple weapons including guns and bombs. He works for both the military and media and his usual work in peacetime is to broadcast poverty, brutality and chaos from Urkaina to confirm the barbaric and totalitarian nature of this people, called "Orcs" in the slang of Big Byz, and their authorities. In other cases he protects discourse mongers with the guns of his drone so that they can denigrate and provoke Urkainian officials safely.

Another invented term is smart free speech, a term used to denote intelligent following (or even predicting) of current political trends by Big Byz media employees in order to earn good money and avoid being ostracized.

The people of Big Byz are not living in paradise either. It turns out that a popular custom among Big Byz elite and pilots is to use robotic women as sexual partners. Sex and pornography with persons under 46 is prohibited due to age of consent, and according to the narrative it is planned to increase it up to 48 due to a lobby of aging porn stars and feminists. Still, having sex with people under 46 isn't a big problem due to the hypocritical rule don't look, don't see; only doing (as well as watching) it in public is punished.

The naturally-decreasing population of Big Byz is usually replenished with immigrants from Urkaine and by child-buyers who go to poor Urkainian villages to buy babies. The rich immigrants from "Urkaine" to Big Byz usually live in a virtual "London" which is nothing more than a 3D picture of London (a parallel with Russian oligarchs) landscape that can be installed in any apartment for good money and is considered most prestigious (while there are other landscapes that can be installed for free).

As the story progresses, Damilola's sex toy elopes with a young orc named Grym, and he loses his drone in pursuit. His personal doom is accompanied by an impending global disaster, as the people of Urkaina sabotage the ground facilities of Big Byz.

Utopia or dystopia 

Pelevin's story makes use of the genre patterns or clichés that developed in the last decades of the twentieth century in works of the dystopian nature. The space is an enclosed whole and is divided inwardly into two - the lower world, surrounded by marshes and the great desert, and the upper, the Byzantium or Offshore, an artificially spherical structure suspended over the territory of an urban natura, completely isolated from the surrounding natural environment.

Instead of Utopian didacticism, the irony that pervades all levels of the narrative comes to the fore. Thus, the outwardly contrapuntal worlds of Byzantium and the Urkaganate are identical in their essential characteristics. All the difference of the upper world lies in the technical perfection that provides its inhabitants with the comfort that the land dwellers lack. At the same time, the basic needs of sex, food, security, and the mountain are regulated in both the lower and upper worlds. While the lower one is the upper one, the lower one is more explicit. There is no individualistic rebellion against the system in the story.

The image of Damilola combines the functions of a narrator-excursor, who introduces the structure of the upper and lower worlds, and at the same time, he is at the same time a propologist and a critic of the system, while Grym, the hero of the story, performs the function of a naive clerk, who has an unbiased perception of the surrounding reality. Damilola's and Grym's points of view intersect, complementing and simultaneously correlating with each other. 

In his novel, Damiola becomes a critic of the system, experiencing the epiphany and daring a late protest, revealing the human nature of the system. In turn, Grym undergoes initiation and becomes convinced of the meaninglessness of that reality, which both humans and orcs considered the embodiment of the dream and the earthly.

If Damiola is closed in his private world and preaches the ideology of a typical Byzantine inhabitant, a prejudiced human being in a postindustrial civilization, then Grym, seeking the truth and the meaning of creation, resembles the classic hero of an anti-utopia. Grim appears to be able to set out on a path of spiritual quest. He breaks free from the circles - the limited and hollow offshore and the world of the Urkaganate, which is embodied by the Circus, symbolizing the closedness and spatial hopelessness.

If in the classical twentieth-century utopias the measure of values is the presence/absence of society and freedom, in Pelevin's novel the main principle for the existence of the upper and lower worlds is the principle of pleasure, counted in monetary equivalent.

Translations 

The book was translated into English by Andrew Bromfield.

The book was translated into Lithuanian by Dalia Saukaitytė

References

Links 
 Masha Boston. CHURCH-AMERICAN IN VIKTOR PELEVIN’S SNUFF // Transcultural Studies, 6-7 (2010-2011), 141-155.

2011 science fiction novels
Novels by Victor Pelevin
Russian science fiction novels
Post-apocalyptic novels
Cyberpunk novels
21st-century Russian novels